Tytthoscincus jaripendek, the Cameron Highlands forest skink, is a species of skink. It is endemic to Malaysia.

References

jaripendek
Endemic fauna of Malaysia
Reptiles of Malaysia
Reptiles described in 2017
Taxa named by Larry Lee Grismer